Mobarakabad (also Romanized as Mobārakābād; also known as Mobark Abade Hoomeh, Mūbārakābād, and Mubarykabad) is a village in Pir Bazar Rural District, in the Central District of Rasht County, Gilan Province, Iran. At the 2006 census, its population was 964, in 261 families.

References 

Populated places in Rasht County